Ioesse rubra is a species of beetle in the family Cerambycidae. It was described by Maurice Pic in 1925, originally under the genus Macrocelosterna. It is known from Thailand, Myanmar, China, Laos, and Vietnam.

References

Petrognathini
Beetles described in 1925